Waama, or Yoabu, is a Gur language of Benin.

References

Oti–Volta languages
Languages of Benin